Ich klage an  is a 1941 Nazi German pro-euthanasia propaganda film directed by Wolfgang Liebeneiner and produced by Heinrich Jonen and Ewald von Demandowsky.

It was banned by Allied powers after the war.

Plot
A beautiful young wife suffering from multiple sclerosis pleads with doctors to kill her. Her husband, a successful doctor himself, gives her a fatal overdose and is put on trial, where arguments are put forth that prolonging life is sometimes contrary to nature, and that death is a right as well as a duty. It culminates in the husband's declaration that he is accusing them of cruelty for trying to prevent such deaths.

Cast

Propaganda elements
This film was commissioned by Nazi propaganda minister Joseph Goebbels at the suggestion of Dr. Karl Brandt, to make the public more supportive of the Aktion T4 euthanasia program. Key scenes from the film were personally inserted by Victor Brack, one of the prominent organisers of the program and later a convicted war criminal. The actual victims of T4 were in fact killed without their consent, or that of their families. Indeed, one cinema goer is alleged to have compared the film to the program and naively asked how abuses could be prevented from creeping into it.

The SS reported that the churches were uniformly negative about the movie, with Catholics expressing it more strongly but Protestants being equally negative. Opinions in medical circles were positive, though there were doubts, especially though not exclusively in cases where patients thought to be incurable had recovered. Legal professions were anxious that it be placed on a legal footing, and in the few polls that were commissioned, the general population were said to be supportive.

References

Bibliography

External links
 
 
 Full film at Archive.org

1941 films
Aktion T4
Nazi propaganda films
Films of Nazi Germany
Films about euthanasia
1940s German-language films
Censored films
German black-and-white films
German drama films
1941 drama films
Films about multiple sclerosis
German courtroom films
1940s German films